The Legacy of Luna is a 2000 book written by Julia Butterfly Hill about her experiences while treesitting in a tree named Luna in the late 1990s.

Book 
The book is based on true events and written like a diary of the two years Julia Butterfly Hill spent squatting in an ancient redwood in order to protect it. The tree had been named Luna by activists.

Hill began treesitting in December 1997 and stopped when she made a deal with the Pacific Lumber Company. In a first person narrative, Hill relates how she appealed to the universal spirit and spoke to the tree. All profits went to the Circle of Life Foundation. The book was published by HarperCollins in 2000.

Reception
Publishers Weekly found her book a "a remarkable inspirational document" whilst also disparaging her "mushy New Age ruminations". Other reviews also enjoyed the first person account of events and praised Hill's activism.

Film adaptation
Rachel Weisz was set to star as Hill in a film adaptation of The Legacy of Luna called Luna, directed by Deepa Mehta. She worked to get the project off the ground, but was unable to do so. She said "I’ve been desperately trying to get that movie together, but right now it’s very hard to get money for dramas, particularly a drama with a female at the centre of it."

See also
Butterfly, a 2000 documentary film about Hill and her campaign

References

2000 non-fiction books
2000 in the environment
Environmental non-fiction books
Films about activists
Julia Butterfly Hill
Harper San Francisco books
Pacific Lumber Company